Diana Adrienne Harris (born 14 August 1948), also known by her married name Diana Mantoura, is a retired English international swimmer.

Swimming career
She represented Great Britain in the Olympic Games and European championships, and swam for England in the Commonwealth Games. She won a bronze medal in the 4×100-metre medley relay at the 1966 European Aquatics Championships. She competed in breaststroke events at the 1968 and 1972 Summer Olympics, but failed to reach the finals.

She represented England at the  1966 British Empire and Commonwealth Games in Kingston, Jamaica and won double gold in the 110 yards breaststroke and the 440 yards medley relay. A second Commonwealth Games appearance came when she represented England in the breaststroke events, at the 1970 British Commonwealth Games in Edinburgh, Scotland.

She won the 100-metre breaststroke event at the 1967 Summer Universiade. At the ASA National British Championships she won the 110 yards breaststroke title in 1965, 1966 and 1968.

References

1948 births
Living people
Sportspeople from London
Swimmers at the 1966 British Empire and Commonwealth Games
Swimmers at the 1970 British Commonwealth Games
Swimmers at the 1968 Summer Olympics
Swimmers at the 1972 Summer Olympics
Olympic swimmers of Great Britain
Female breaststroke swimmers
English female swimmers
European Aquatics Championships medalists in swimming
Commonwealth Games medallists in swimming
Commonwealth Games gold medallists for England
Universiade medalists in swimming
Universiade gold medalists for Great Britain
Universiade silver medalists for Great Britain
Medalists at the 1967 Summer Universiade
Medallists at the 1966 British Empire and Commonwealth Games